A peak ring crater is a type of complex crater, which is different from a multi-ringed basin or central-peak crater. A central peak is not seen; instead, a roughly circular ring or plateau, possibly discontinuous, surrounds the crater's center, with the crater rim still farther out from the center.

Formation

The rings form by different processes, and inner rings may not be formed by the same processes as outer rings.

It has long been the view that peak rings are formed in the stage subsequent to central peak formation in craters. The central peaks of craters are believed to originate from hydrodynamic flow of material lifted by inward-collapsing crater walls, while impact-shattered rock debris is briefly turned to fluid by strong vibrations that develop during crater formation. The peak-ring structure of Chicxulub crater was probably formed as inward-collapsing material struck the over-steepened central peak, to form a hydraulic jump at the location where the peak ring was located.

Other theories have been formulated. Perhaps, in the case of Chicxulub crater, an over-high central peak collapsed into the peak ring.

According to Sean Gulick, a geophysicist at the University of Texas, Chicxulub is Earth's only crater to have an intact peak ring structure. However, another example is shown below at West Clearwater Lake in Canada.

Examples

See also

On Mercury:
 Ahmad Baba
 Caravaggio
 Chekhov
 Eminescu
 Holst
 Homer
 Michelangelo
 Mozart
 Nabokov
 Polygnotus
 Rachmaninoff
 Raditladi
 Renoir

On Venus:
 Barton
 Isabella
 Meitner
 Mona Lisa
 Wheatley
 Yablochkina

On Earth:
 Chesapeake Bay
 Chicxulub
 Ries
 West Clearwater Lake

On the Moon:
 Apollo
 Antoniadi
 Grimaldi
 Hertzsprung
 Korolev
 Milne
 Poincaré
 Schrödinger
 Schiller-Zucchius Basin
 Freundlich-Sharonov Basin

On Mars:
 Galle
 Herschel
 Kepler
 Lowell
 Lyot
 Schiaparelli

References

External links and references
 Understanding the Impact Cratering Process: a Simple Approach
 How the dino-killing asteroid put a ring on its crater, Scott K. Johnson, Ars Technica, 11/17/2016
 Peak-Ring Structure, Encyclopedia of Planetary Landforms
 The formation of peak rings in large impact craters, Joanna V. Morgan et al., 2016, Science, 18 Nov 2016: Vol. 354, Issue 6314, pp. 878–882

Impact craters
Impact geology